A tribal name is a name of an ethnic tribe —usually of ancient origin, which represented its self-identity.

Studies of Native American tribal names show that most had an original meaning comparable to "human," "people" "us"—the "tribal" name for itself was often the localized ethnic self-perception of the general word for "human being."

See also
 Native American name controversy

Names
Tribes